Buliciano is a village in Tuscany, central Italy, in the comune of Colle di Val d'Elsa, province of Siena.

Buliciano is about 35 km from Siena and 8 km from Colle di Val d'Elsa.

Bibliography 
 

Frazioni of Colle di Val d'Elsa